The Wertheins are an important family of entrepreneurs in Argentina who own and control the Werthein Group.

The Werthein family, headed by Leon Werthein, his wife Raquel and five of their children emigrated to Argentina from Bessarabia in 1904, and settled in rural Miguel Riglos, La Pampa Province.

Agriculture
Three of Leon Werthein's sons; Gregorio, Numo and Noel (1911–2002), started a company in 1928 dedicated to manage agribusiness, and have maintained farming interests in Argentina ever since. Gregorio, Numo y Noel Werthein SA was founded in 1959 and includes extensive agricultural and fruit processing holdings. Its agricultural holdings include over 100,000 hectares (250,000 acres) of land and over 45,000 cattle, distributed in the Provinces of Buenos Aires, La Pampa, Santa Fe and San Luis. They produce wheat, corn, sunflowers, soybeans, cotton, popcorn, candy, sunflower oil, black beans, red beans, and beef as well as a Ranch division that specializes in developing high-quality genetics in the following breeds of cattle: Angus and Hereford (south), Brangus and Braford (North). The fruit area produces apples, pears, peaches, apricots, strawberries and plums in dried form and as a fruit juice concentrate.

Banking and services
Julio Werthein (born April 7, 1918) has been involved in the Argentine banking sector since 1940.

Banco Mercantil Argentino
In 1963 Julio Werthein and his brothers established the Banco Mercantil Argentino. This bank was founded on September 18, 1928 as Banco Israelita Argentino SA, and renamed as Banco Mercantil Argentino SA on October 4, 1940. In 1998, the Banco Mercantil Argentino, with Banco Caja de Ahorro (Savings Bank), merged. In 2000, Banco SUDAMERIS Argentina acquired the Banco Caja de Ahorro, and after several subsequent mergers and organizational reforms, the Banco Mercantil is now the new Banco Patagonia, though the Werthein family no longer holds shares therein.

In 1995, the Fundacion Banco Mercantil Argentino was established for the support of music, literature and fine arts.

Los W SA
Numerous holdings of the Wertheins are managed under Los W SA aegis.

Caja de Ahorro y Seguro - Insurances
The Caja de Ahorro y Seguro and its subsidiaries is one of the largest insurance companies in Argentina. President: Adrian Werthein (born on January 18, 1952).

Telecom Argentina
The Wertheins acquired 48 percent of Sofora Telecomunicaciones SA in 2005 for 125 million euros from France Telecom, which in turn holds a 68% stake in Nortel Inversora SA, as well as 55% stake in Telecom Argentina.

Other holdings
Los W Group is a private holding company that owns and manages a well-diversified portfolio of companies in Argentina, with total revenues of approx. US$4,2 Bn and 21.500 employees.
During the 20th century, the Group has successfully invested in agribusiness, telecommunications, financial services, gas and energy distribution, oil & gas, textile, vineyards and real estate. 
Los W has become a very prestigious and well-known group within the business community as a consequence of its strong local presence, excellent track-record, experience in several industries, and a persistent low profile. 
The Group strongly believes in its successful strategy based on the combination of international first tier institutional investors or a strategic player in partnership with a local prestigious and experienced group (i.e. Leucadia and Generali in Caja de Ahorro y Seguro; Telecom Italia in Telecom Argentina and Standard Bank in Standard Bank Argentina).

Family business history
Leon Werthein emigrated from Russia in 1904 and came to Argentina, following difficult times in that empire, especially for Jewish people. The family settled in the countryside and started out a living from scratch, and fifty years later moved to the city to provide for the education of the children and the growth of the business. It is important to note that the growth of the family lead to two different processes of family separation. The first one was in 1973 and the second one in 1992. The descendants of Noel Werthein plus one cousin constitute what today is the W Group, heirs of the original family business.
1904: Leon Werthein arrives to Argentina, settling down in Riglos (Province of La Pampa).
1928: Three of Leon’s sons, Gregorio, Numo and Noel, created a company dedicated to manage agribusiness.
1959: Foundation of Gregorio, Numo and Noel Werthein (“GNNW”), which consolidates and manages the agribusiness investments of the Group. Nowadays, GNNW owns land in the provinces of Buenos Aires, La Pampa, Santa Fe and San Luis.
1963: Acquisition of Banco Mercantil Argentino, first investment in the banking sector.
1965: Creation of Citrex, a citric producer in the Provinces of Misiones, Formosa and Tucuman.
1970: Acquisition of Industrias del Vestir Argentino (“IVA”), the largest wool manufacturer company in Argentina.
1979: Divestiture of Citrex.
1980: Acquisition of Finca Flichman, a vineyard with more than 100 years, in the Province of Mendoza.
Since 1990, Los W Group has been involved in the following transactions, among others.
1992 - Citicorp Equity Investments: Acquisition of 9.11% of CEI from Citicorp. CEI was the third largest group in Argentina with interests in telecommunications, utilities, media and other industries. In 1997 there was an additional acquisition of an 11.43% stake in CEI from Citicorp. CEI was involved in the acquisition and divestiture of several companies, including:
TGS – 1992
Multicanal – 1994
TyC Torneos y Competencias – 1997
Hotel Llao Llao – 1997, etc.
1992: EDELAP is the energy distributor to the area of La Plata, and other locations, covering an area of 5.700 km2.
1992/1998: YAR S.A. built and sold more than 160.000 sqm. in 3 important residential projects in Buenos Aires city (Torres de Figueroa Alcorta, Torres de Buenos Aires and Papelera Sarandí), among other buildings.
1994: Caja de Ahorro y Seguro is the leader company in the Argentine insurance market. Caja de Ahorro was later involved in several other transactions in the insurance and banking sectors.
1994: AFJP Activa – Anticipar was a private pension fund.
1996: Divestiture of AFJP Activa – Anticipar.
1997: Divestiture of Finca Flichman to Sogrape, a Portuguese wine and liquor producer. Finca Flichman was a vineyard acquired in the 1980s.
1997: Divestiture of Los W's stake in EDELAP to Houston Lightning & Power and Techint.
1998: 20.54% stake in CEI was sold to Hicks, Muse, Tate & Furst, a well known US private equity fund, and other investors.
2003: Acquisition of Telecom Argentina, one of the largest private sector corporations in Argentina. The incumbent provides fixed and mobile telephony and Internet services in Argentina and Paraguay.
2005: Acquisition from the founders of 100% of Cachay, a local infusion producer, which sells “mate” under the brand “Cachamate” and tea under a well known generic brand, “Cachamai”.
2007: Joint venture between GNNW, Petrosiel and Energial to explore, develop and produce hydrocarbon in the Salinas Grande I’s and Gobernador Ayala VI areas in the province of La Pampa, Argentina.
2007: Acquisition of Bank Boston's Argentinean branch from Bank of America. Standard Bank Argentina (ex Bank Boston Argentina) was the eight largest private bank in terms of assets, loans and deposits.

Members of Werthein family
 Gregorio Werthein (ca. 1908) - Agriculture
 Numo Werthein (ca. 1910) - Agriculture
 worked for the foundation Casa Argentina en Israel 
Arnoldo (ca. 1930s)
Pablo Werthein
Marcelo (ca. 1948)
Ana Lia Werthein (23.10.1949 in Barrio Norte) - artist 
Abraham Werthein (20.03.1911)
Martha Werthein  (22.01.1937)
Jorge Werthein  (20.09.1941), educator, former Director UNESCO USA and Brazil

Noel Werthein (ca. 1911) - agriculture and bank manager
 Leo Werthein (born 17.12.1935 - died 15.06.2005) - cattle breeding
 3 sons + 3 grandchildren 
 Daniel Werthein (born September 1946) - Agriculture division and Werthein Group president
 Adrian Werthein (born 18.01.1952) - bank manager
 Julio Werthein (born 07.04.1918 - died 22.09.2013) - bank manager
 Gerardo Werthein (born 03.12.1955) (nephew of Julio Werthein) - bank manager, elected President of the Argentine Olympic Committee in 2009.
 Sara Werthein
 Gregorio Werthein
 Fanny Werthein (born 08.04.1907 - died 14.09.2000)
 Moisés Lissin (born 03.05.1929 - died 24.03.2011)
 León Lissin

References 

Argentine businesspeople
Argentine families
Jewish families
Argentine Jews
Bessarabian Jews
Argentine billionaires
Argentine people of Russian-Jewish descent
Argentine people of Romanian-Jewish descent
Businesspeople in agriculture